Nucet is a commune in Dâmbovița County, Muntenia, Romania with a population of 4,057 people. It is composed of three villages: Cazaci, Ilfoveni, and Nucet.

Natives
 Mihai Antonescu
 Rodica Stănoiu

References

Communes in Dâmbovița County
Localities in Muntenia